Houston Cellular was a Houston-based cell phone company which provided AMPS and D-AMPS (TDMA) service in the Greater Houston area. It was formed in 1983 and was operated as a partnership between LIN Broadcasting Corp., Mobile Communication Corp. of America and BellSouth Co. Its headquarters were located in Houston, Texas.

Through a series of acquisitions and mergers, within 10 years, the company consisted of a two-way partnership between BellSouth and AT&T Wireless. This partnership was also known as BellSouth Mobility, LLC. Houston Cellular began providing service in May 1986.

History
Houston Cellular was formed as a result of the October 1983 Federal Communications Commission's ruling that set aside sufficient frequencies for the operation of two cellular systems in each metropolitan area. In the early 1990s, this ruling was expanded with the advent of the 800 and 1900 MHz protocols, which are also known as PCS). The ruling reserved one system for application by local phone companies. In Houston, the competing non-local company service was applied by GTE Mobilnet.

In June 2000, the above-mentioned FCC ruling was repealed and GTE merged with Bell Atlantic to form Verizon Wireless.  At that time, AT&T Wireless sold its 55% stake in Houston Cellular to BellSouth. AT&T Wireless then bought 20 MHz of the CDMA spectrum owned by the outgoing PrimeCo (which was swallowed in the formation of Verizon Wireless). This purchase of frequencies was used to directly compete in the Houston market with D-AMPS (TDMA) service. Additionally, Southwestern Bell Mobile Systems, a division of Southwestern Bell Telephone Company, was also partnered with GTE, a partnership which that was later dissolved.

In 2001, BellSouth partnered with Southwestern Bell Mobile Systems. This partnership renamed the division from BellSouth Mobility, LLC to Cingular Wireless, LLC. It also transformed Houston Cellular into Cingular Wireless.

Later Developments
In 2006, the parent company of Southwestern Bell Mobile Systems, AT&T Inc., acquired BellSouth. Eventually, this led to the renaming of Cingular Wireless, LLC to AT&T Mobility, LLC. The service was later branded as "Wireless from AT&T, formerly Cingular Wireless", "Wireless from AT&T", and is now simply "AT&T".

References

External links

Houston Cellular (Archive)
Cellular Mobile Services

Other sources
 Legal Battle with BellSouth over Domain Names: U.S. Supreme Court Case 05-718 Reuben Norman, Petitioner v. BellSouth Intellectual Property Corporation
 AT&T History and science resources at The Franklin Institute's Case Files online exhibit
 Brand evolution of AT&T companies
 Press Release announcing FCC Approval of SBC-Ameritech merger (1999-10-06)
 Stock Quote from Yahoo!
 July 2005 IEEE Article
 Yahoo! — AT&T Corp. Company Profile
 ATT's most recent conference call transcripts
 Unnatural Monopoly: Critical Moments in the Development of the Bell System Monopoly by Adam D. Thierer
 AT&T Cell phone frequencies, and what do they mean?
 "AT&T buys IBM's Global Network", BBC News, December 8, 1998
 "SBC closes AT&T acquisition", CNet News, November 18, 2005
 "SBC launches 'new' AT&T", AT&T archive, November 18, 2005
 "AT&T to buy BellSouth for $67 billion", CNet News, March 5, 2006
 "AT&T gets final approval to acquire BellSouth, CNNMoney, December 29, 2006
 "AT&T and BellSouth Join to Create a Premier Global Communications Company", AT&T News Room, December 29, 2006
Yahoo! - AT&T Mobility LLC Company Profile

AT&T subsidiaries
Bell System
Defunct mobile phone companies of the United States
Defunct companies based in Texas
Companies based in Houston
American companies established in 1984
Telecommunications companies established in 1984
Telecommunications companies disestablished in 2006
1995 establishments in Texas
2006 disestablishments in Texas